The Hallstätter Glacier (formerly also called the Karleisfeld or Karl Icefield) is the largest glacier in the Dachstein Mountains. It lies immediately beneath the northern foot of the Dachstein itself and runs down to the Eissee lake below the Simony Hut at a height of 2,205 m. To the east the  Hallstätter Glacier is bounded by the High Gjaidstein. Firmly sealed off at its western snout by the Schöberl, 2,426 m, it is bordered in the west by the eastern flank of the Hohes Kreuz ridge, running from south to north, which reaches a height of 2,837 metres.
In its upper third the glacier flows around a prominent landmark, the Eisstein. At its head in the south it is also bordered by the Hunerkogel and the Dirndln.

Other glaciers on the Dachstein are the  Gosau Glacier to the west and the Schladminger Glacier to the east.

Retreat of the glacier 

The glacier is very sensitive to the climate, as can be seen with views from the Simonyhütte (within 25 years):

References

Sources 
 Roman Moser: Der Hallstätter Gletscher - heute der größte Gletscher der Nördlichen Kalkalpen.  In: Oberösterreichische Heimatblätter 8(1954)1-2, S. 103 (Digitalisat)
 Herbert Weingartner: Lehrpfad Hallstätter Gletscher - Ein Begleiter durch die Gebirgslandschaft am Dachstein . Atelier Tintifax, Breitenfurt

Dachstein Mountains
Glaciers of Austria
Glaciers of the Alps